October 4 - Eastern Orthodox liturgical calendar - October 6

All fixed commemorations below celebrated on October 18 by Eastern Orthodox Churches on the Old Calendar.

For October 5th, Orthodox Churches on the Old Calendar commemorate the Saints listed on September 22.

Saints
 Hieromartyrs Dionysius of Alexandria, Bishop of Alexandria, and the Deacons Gaius and Faustus (264-265)
 Martyr Charitina of Amisus (304)  (see also: September 4, January 15)
 Hieromartyr Hermogenes the Wonderworker, Bishop of Samos, whose relics are in Cyprus.
 Martyr Mamelta (Mamelchtha) of Persia (344)
 Saint Gregory (Grigol), Archimandrite of Khandzta in the Klarjeti desert, Georgia (861)
 St. Cosmas, Abbot, in Bithynia (10th century)

Pre-Schism Western saints
 Saint Palmatius and Companions, martyrs in Trier in Germany under Maximian Herculeus (c. 287)
 Saint Boniface, one of the martyrs with St Palmatius and Companions in Trier in Germany (c. 287)
 Saint Alexander, one of the 'innumerable multitude' martyred in Trier in Germany under Diocletian (3rd century)
 Saint Marcellinus of Ravenna, the second or third Bishop of Ravenna in Italy (3rd century)
 Saints Firmatus, a Deacon, and Flaviana, a virgin, venerated as martyrs in Auxerre in France.
 Saint Apollinaris of Valence (Aiplonay), Bishop of Valence (c. 520)
 Saint Galla of Rome, a lady in Rome who, as a widow, led the life of an anchoress on the Vatican Hill, where she died of breast cancer (c. 550)
 Saint Magdalveus (Madalveus, Mauvé), a monk at St Vannes and later (c 736) Bishop of Verdun (776)
 Saint Meinulph, founder of the monastery of Böddeken in Westphalia in Germany (c. 859)
 Saint Aymard of Cluny, Abbot of Cluny in France (965)
 Saint Attilanus, a Spanish Benedictine and Bishop of Zamora, he was prior of Moreruela Abbey (1009)

Post-Schism Orthodox saints
 Saints Damian the Healer (1071), and Saints Jeremiah (c. 1070) and Matthew (c. 1085), clairvoyants, of the Kiev Caves.
 Saint John (Mavropos), Metropolitan of Euchaita (1100)
 Saint Charitina, Princess of Lithuania (1281)
 Saint Sabbas the Fool-for-Christ, of Vatopedi monastery, Mt. Athos (1350)  (see also: June 15 )
 Saint Varlaam, desert-dweller of Chikoysk (1846)
 Venerable Methodia, recluse, of Kimolos (1908)
 Saint Seraphim (Amelin), schema-archimandrite of Glinsk Hermitage (1958)

New Martys and Confessors
 New Hiero-confessor Gabriel (Igoshkin), Archimandrite, of Melekess (Saratov), Confessor (1959)

Other commemorations
 Synaxis of the Venerable Fathers and Mothers of the Klarjeti Wilderness, holy fellow-strugglers of St. Gregory of Khandzta (9th century)
 Synaxis of the Hierarchs of Moscow:
 Saints Peter (1326), Alexis (1378), Jonah (1461), Macarius (1563), Philip (1569), Job (1607), Hermogenes (1612), Philaret (1867), Innocent (Veniaminov) (1879), Tikhon (1925), Macarius II (1926), and Peter (Polyansky) (1937), Hierarchs of Moscow.
 Synaxis of All Saints Who Shone Forth in the Iberian Peninsula (established 2018) — (On the Sunday before October 12 — between October 5-11 )
 Uncovering of the relics (1841) of Venerable Eudocimus the Unknown, monk of Vatopedi monastery, Mt. Athos.
 Uncovering of the relics (1985) of New Hiero-confessor Basil (Preobrazhensky), Bishop of Kineshma (1945)
 Repose of Nun Agnia (Countess Anna Orlova-Chesmenskaya) of Novgorod (1848)
 Repose of Hieroschemamonk Paisius (Olaru) of Sihastria, Romania (1990)

Icon gallery

Notes

References

Sources 
 October 5/18. Orthodox Calendar (PRAVOSLAVIE.RU).
 October 18 / October 5. HOLY TRINITY RUSSIAN ORTHODOX CHURCH (A parish of the Patriarchate of Moscow).
 October 5. OCA - The Lives of the Saints.
 The Autonomous Orthodox Metropolia of Western Europe and the Americas (ROCOR). St. Hilarion Calendar of Saints for the year of our Lord 2004. St. Hilarion Press (Austin, TX). p. 74.
 The Fifth Day of the Month of October. Orthodoxy in China.
 October 5. Latin Saints of the Orthodox Patriarchate of Rome.
 The Roman Martyrology. Transl. by the Archbishop of Baltimore. Last Edition, According to the Copy Printed at Rome in 1914. Revised Edition, with the Imprimatur of His Eminence Cardinal Gibbons. Baltimore: John Murphy Company, 1916. pp. 307–308.
 Rev. Richard Stanton. A Menology of England and Wales, or, Brief Memorials of the Ancient British and English Saints Arranged According to the Calendar, Together with the Martyrs of the 16th and 17th Centuries. London: Burns & Oates, 1892. pp. 475–476.
Greek Sources
 Great Synaxaristes:  5 ΟΚΤΩΒΡΙΟΥ. ΜΕΓΑΣ ΣΥΝΑΞΑΡΙΣΤΗΣ.
  Συναξαριστής. 5 Οκτωβρίου. ECCLESIA.GR. (H ΕΚΚΛΗΣΙΑ ΤΗΣ ΕΛΛΑΔΟΣ).
  05/10/2016. Ορθόδοξος Συναξαριστής. 
Russian Sources
  18 октября (5 октября). Православная Энциклопедия под редакцией Патриарха Московского и всея Руси Кирилла (электронная версия). (Orthodox Encyclopedia - Pravenc.ru).
  5 октября по старому стилю / 18 октября по новому стилю. Русская Православная Церковь - Православный церковный календарь на 2016 год.

October in the Eastern Orthodox calendar